Ujjwala Raut (born 11 June 1978) is an Indian supermodel.

Career
Raut was a 17-year-old commerce student when she won "Femina Look of the Year" at the Femina Miss India 1996 contest. She was also among the top fifteen in the 1996 Elite Model Look contest in Nice. She walked the runway for, among others: Yves Saint-Laurent, Roberto Cavalli, Hugo Boss, Cynthia Rowley, Diane von Furstenberg, Dolce & Gabbana, Betsey Johnson, Gucci, Givenchy, Valentino, Oscar de la Renta, and Emilio Pucci, and the Victoria's Secret Fashion Show. She walked twice for the Victoria's Secret Fashion Show in 2002 and 2003. In 2012, she hosted and judged the Kingfisher Calendar Hunt with model Milind Soman.

Personal life
Her father is a Deputy Commissioner of Police. She was married to Maxwell Sterry on 19 June 2004 and the couple divorced in 2011. They have one daughter named Ksha.

Television

References

External links 

1978 births
Living people
Female models from Mumbai